Pareuchaetes arravaca is a moth of the subfamily Arctiinae. It was described by Karl Jordan in 1916. It is found in French Guiana.

References

Phaegopterina
Moths described in 1916